Dana Broccoli ( Natol; January 3, 1922 – February 29, 2004) was an American actress.

Biography 
Dana Natol was born January 3, 1922, in New York City to an Irish Italian family. She studied acting at the Cecil Clovelly's Academy of Dramatic Arts at Carnegie Hall. She worked on stage in New York and Boston and married Batman actor Lewis Wilson, with whom she had son Michael G. Wilson. However they separated after his service in the Army during World War II. After their divorce she moved to Beverly Hills. She worked as a screenwriter and had a number of small parts in films. There she met film producer Albert R. Broccoli. They married and Broccoli moved to London with him. There she worked with him behind the scenes on his production of the James Bond film series. Broccoli had a daughter Barbara Broccoli and also adopted her husband's earlier two children.  She is credited as having recommended Sean Connery to her husband for the role. In the aftermath of her husband's death in 1996 Broccoli became chairman of the company.

Broccoli also wrote the novels, Scenario for Murder (1949) and Florinda (1977), the latter was adapted into the West End theatre musical, La Cava in 2000. Broccoli died in Los Angeles, California on February 29, 2004.

References 

1922 births
2004 deaths
Actresses from New York City
20th-century American actresses
20th-century American women writers
Writers from New York City
American women film producers
Film producers from New York (state)